The 2020 season was Kedah's 12th season in the Malaysia Super League since its inception in 2004.

Management team

Players

Transfers and contracts

Pre-Season

In

Out

Extension of contract

To be confirmed

Mid-Season

Out

Friendlies

Pre-season Friendlies

Tour of Cambodia

Mid-season Friendlies

Competitions

Malaysia Super League

League table

Fixtures and results

Malaysia Cup

AFC Champions League

Qualifying play-off

Statistics

Appearances and goals

Statistics accurate as of 8 August 2019.

Notes

References 

Kedah Darul Aman F.C.
Kedah Darul Aman F.C. seasons
Kedah